Quỳnh Phụ is a rural district of Thái Bình province in the Red River Delta region of Vietnam. As of 2003, the district had a population of 247,793 . The district covers an area of 207 km². The district capital lies at Quỳnh Côi.

References

Districts of Thái Bình province